Mark Peers (born 14 May 1984) was a professional footballer who played for Canterbury United FC as a wide-midfielder/winger.

Playing career

Early career
Peers began his footballing career at Liverpool in 2001. He left for Raith Rovers in 2003. Peers got off to a good start at Raith by scoring on his debut but was to make only another 4 appearances before leaving Scotland early in 2004.

English Non-League
The pacey wide-midfield man then moved to Prescot Cables where he would remain until February 2005 before joining Leigh RMI in the conference premier division. He would remain there until 2006 when he moved to Witton Albion, he would play more than 100 games and scored 17 goals in one season. He left for Fleetwood Town on 17 June 2008. He would remain there until February 2009, when he signed for F.C. Halifax Town. In the summer of 2010, he joined the newly reformed Chester on trial and scored a spectacular goal in a friendly win against Aberystwyth Town. He later joined the club on contract.

On 21 October 2010 he moved to Northwich Victoria. and made his debut two days later against Burscough.

Having played around 25 league and cup games for the Vics he then had a short and rather troubled injury hit 8 weeks with Kendal town and decided to make the switch to Ashton United F.C. in October 2011. He spent almost 18 months with Ashton United playing around 40 games before deciding to make the switch and play down under by joining Armadale SC in the Western Australia State League in March 2013.

References

External links

1984 births
Living people
Association football midfielders
English footballers
Liverpool F.C. players
Raith Rovers F.C. players
FC Halifax Town players
Chester F.C. players
Fleetwood Town F.C. players
Prescot Cables F.C. players
Witton Albion F.C. players
Leigh Genesis F.C. players
Southport F.C. players
Northwich Victoria F.C. players
Kendal Town F.C. players
Ashton United F.C. players
Canterbury United players
Scottish Football League players
Northern Premier League players